A dollhouse is a miniature replica of a house.

Dollhouse, Doll House, doll house or doll's house may also refer to:

Media

Television 

 Dollhouse (TV series), a series created by Joss Whedon
 "Dollhouse", a season 5 episode of Law & Order: Criminal Intent

Music 

 Dollhouse (Melanie Martinez EP), 2014
 "Dollhouse" (Melanie Martinez song), from the aforementioned EP
 "Dollhouse" (Priscilla Renea song), 2009
 "Dollhouse", a song by Bruce Springsteen from Tracks

Literature 

 The Sandman: The Doll's House, a trade paperback collection of The Sandman
 "The Doll-House", a short story by James Cross
 "The Doll's House" (short story), a 1922 short story by Katherine Mansfield
 Dollhouse, a DC Comics supervillain
 Dollhouse (book), a 2011 book by Kim Kardashian, Khloe Kardashian and Kourtney Kardashian

Other 

 Dollhouse (2012 film), a film directed by Kirsten Sheridan
 A Doll's House, a play by Henrik Ibsen
 The Dollhouse, American professional wrestling stable from Total Nonstop Action Wrestling
 "The Doll House" (episode), a dramatic reading of Dark Shadows
 The Jerma985 Dollhouse, a livestreamed event

Places
The Doll House, a former restaurant in Pasadena, California
Benedict Doll House, a private house in Coldwater, Michigan

See also
 
 A Doll's House (disambiguation)